The AE-COPSD European Police Parachuting Brevet (BPPE) (French: Brevet Parachutiste du Policier Européen (BPPE)) is a decoration awarded by the European Association of Bodies and Public Organizations of Security and Defense (French: Association Européenne des Membres de Corps et Organismes Publics de Sécurité et de Défense (AE-COPSD)).

Requirements
Officers can qualify for the AE-COPSD European Police Parachuting Brevet (BPPE) by the following requirements:

 Making a joint jump into a jump zone in the presence of an authorised AE-COPSD inspector, and carrying out a minimum of four jumps in automatic static line parachutes.
 Officers can also achieve the badge by equivalence, for those who already have their countries parachute certification.

See also
AE-COPSD Sports badge

External links
 Brevet Parachutiste du Policier Européen webpage. AE-COPSD website 

Parachutist badges
Law enforcement in Europe
Awards established in 1981
Paratroopers